Pocket Hercules: Naim Suleymanoglu is a Turkish biographical drama film directed by Ozer Feyzioglu, written by Barış Pirhasan and produced by Mustafa Uslu. The film tells about the life of Naim Suleymanoglu, nicknamed "Pocket Hercules". In this life story, the Bulgarian Communist Party led by Todor Jivkov tells about the replacement of the names of the Bulgarian Turks with Bulgarian names by state force, which was put into practice at the end of 1984 under the government. In addition, the results of the Bulgarization campaign called the "Resurrection Process" by the official authorities and Naim's attempts to leave Bulgaria to announce this situation to the world are widely covered.

It tells about Naim Suleymanoglu's 11 years, starting from his acquaintance with weightlifting in the 1970s when he was 10 years old, until the Seoul Olympics in 1988. We are watching him achieve his first World Record, Olympic titles, European titles and World titles, and many other achievements by having the title of the youngest world record holder in the weightlifting category at the age of 15.

The film was shot in Turkey, Bulgaria, Melbourne, Brazil, the United Kingdom, the United States and Moscow.

Background 
The film was released on 22 November 2019. The track "Naim", the soundtrack to the film, was composed by rapper Eypio. It was also released on the Internet movie portal Netflix 10 months after its release.

On IMDb it was given 8.5/10, on Sinemalar it was given 8.4/10, and on Beyazperde it was given 9.4/10.

Cast 

 Hayat Van Eck - Naim Süleymanoğlu
 Yetkin Dikinciler - Süleyman Süleymanoğlu
 Selen Öztürk - Hatice Süleymanoğlu
 Gürkan Uygun - Enver Türkileri
 İsmail Hacıoğlu - Mehmet Tunç
 Uğur Güneş - Cemal Tunalı
 Renan Bilek - Remzi
 Barış Kıralioğlu - Turgut Özal
 Bülent Alkış - Atalay Göktuna
 Levent Ülgen - Can Pulak
 Berat Yenilmez - Selim Egeli

References 

2019 films
2010s Turkish-language films